Carl Schlechter (2 March 1874 – 27 December 1918) was a leading Austro-Hungarian chess master and theoretician at the turn of the 20th century. He is best known for drawing a World Chess Championship match with Emanuel Lasker.

Early life

Schlechter was born into a Catholic family in Vienna. He is sometimes deemed to be Jewish, although others dispute this. He began playing chess at the age of 13. His first and only teacher was an Austria-Hungarian chess problemist, Dr. Samuel Gold.

From 1893 onwards he played in over 50 international chess tournaments. He won or shared first at Munich 1900 (the 12th DSB Congress), Coburg 1904 (the 14th DSB Congress), Ostend 1906, Stockholm 1906, Vienna 1908, Prague 1908, Hamburg 1910 (the 17th DSB Congress), and thrice in the Trebitsch Memorial in Vienna (1911, 1912, 1913).

Schlechter played several matches. He drew with Georg Marco (+0 −0 =10) in 1893, drew with Marco and Adolf Zinkl both (+4 −4 =3) in 1894, drew with Dawid Janowski (+2 −2 =3) in 1896, drew with Simon Alapin (+1 −1 =4) in 1899, beat Janowski (+6 −1 =3) in 1902, drew with Richard Teichmann (+1 −1 =1) in 1904, and drew with Siegbert Tarrasch (+3 −3 =10) in 1911.

Lasker–Schlechter match

In 1910 Schlechter played a match against Emanuel Lasker for the World Chess Championship (in Vienna and Berlin). Schlechter was leading by one point going into the tenth and final game of the match. In the tenth game tragedy struck: after first achieving a won game, Schlechter blundered into a clearly drawn position, and then blundered again which led to his loss of the game. The match ended tied at 5–5 (+1 −1 =8) and Lasker retained his title. It is disputed as to whether Schlechter needed to score +2 to win the match and thus needed to win the tenth game. No contract for the match has ever been found and no evidence supporting this rumor has ever been produced. (For match details see World Chess Championship 1910.) Schlechter distinguished himself as the first player in 16 years to seriously challenge Lasker's world title.

Later life

During World War I, he thrice won Trebitsch Memorial in Vienna. In the last year of his life, he took third in Vienna, lost a match to Akiba Rubinstein (+1 −2 =3), took second place in Berlin (Quadrangular, Milan Vidmar won), tied for third place in Kaschau, and took third place in Berlin (Quadrangular, Emanuel Lasker won). Schlechter died of pneumonia and starvation on 27 December 1918, and was buried in Budapest on 31 December 1918.

Assessment

The Carl Schlechter–Arthur Kaufmann–Hugo Fähndrich trio propagated the Viennese chess school, founded by Max Weiss in the 19th century.

Schlechter prepared the eighth and final edition of the famous Handbuch des Schachspiels openings treatise. Published in eleven parts between 1912 and 1916, it totaled 1,040 pages and included contributions by Rudolf Spielmann, Siegbert Tarrasch, and Richard Teichmann. International Master William Hartston called it "a superb work, perhaps the last to encase successfully the whole of chess knowledge within a single volume."

He was a typical example of a gentleman chess player of old, offering courteous draws to opponents who felt unwell. If his opponent arrived late for a game, Schlechter would inconspicuously subtract an equal amount of time from his own clock. He also mentored many of his rivals, including Oldřich Duras.

List of opening variations named after Schlechter

There are several "Schlechter Variations" in the chess openings:
Schlechter Gambit of the Bird's Opening 1.f4 e5 2.fxe5 Nc6
Schlechter Variation of the French Defence 1.e4 e6 2.d4 d5 3.Bd3
Schlechter Variation of the Slav Defence 1.d4 d5 2.c4 c6 3.Nf3 Nf6 4.e3 g6 (or via a Grünfeld move-order, 1.d4 Nf6 2.c4 g6 3.Nc3 d5 4.e3 c6)
Schlechter Variation of the Danish Gambit 1.e4 e5 2.d4 exd4 3.c3 dxc3 4. Bc4 cxb2 5.Bxb2 d5

Notable games 
Fried–Schlechter, Vienna 1894, From's Gambit (A02), 0–1 A breezy 14-move win by Schlechter, who sacrifices his queen and mates his opponent's king in the middle of the board.
Bernhard Fleissig–Schlechter, Vienna 1893 (friendly), Polish Opening: General (A00), 0–1 One of Schlechter's most famous games, Black sacrifices both his rooks and bishops.
Schlechter–Steinitz, Cologne 1898 Vienna Game (C28), 1–0 Schlechter routs the former World Champion in 24 moves.
Schlechter–Meitner, Vienna 1899, Italian Game: Classical Variation. Greco Gambit Moeller–Therkatz Attack (C54), 1–0 A combination in the endgame: White sacrifices his queen then makes a quiet move with his king, and Black is unable to prevent a mate in two moves.

In popular culture
The central character of the 1998 novel Carl Haffner's Love of the Draw by Thomas Glavinic is closely based on Schlechter. The book presents a fictionalised account of his 1910 World Chess Championship match with Lasker.

References

External links 

1874 births
1918 deaths
Austrian chess players
Chess theoreticians
20th-century deaths from tuberculosis
19th-century chess players
Game players from Vienna
Tuberculosis deaths in Hungary
Deaths from pneumonia in Hungary
Deaths by starvation
Chess players from the Austro-Hungarian Empire